Zaw is a Burmese name that may refer to
Adrian Zaw (born 1984), Burmese-born American actor
Aung Zaw (footballer) (born 1990), Burmese football defender
Aung Zaw (editor) (born ca. 1968), Burmese journalist and editor 
Ba Zaw (1891–1942), Burmese artist 
Hein Thiha Zaw (born 1995), Burmese football defender 
Kyaw Zaw (1919–2012), one of the founders of the modern Burmese Army 
Myint Zaw (fl. 2010s), Burmese journalist and activist
Myo Min Zaw (fl. 1990s–2010s), Burmese democracy activist
Myo Zaw Aung (born 1980), Burmese Member of Parliament
Myo Zaw Oo (born 1992), Burmese football midfielder 
Ni Ni Khin Zaw (born 1991), Burmese pop singer 
Phone Zaw Han (fl. 2000s–2010s), Burmese city mayor
Pyae Phyo Zaw (born 1994), Brumese football defender 
Thein Zaw (born 1994), Burmese football defender
Thiha Zaw (born 1993), Burmese football midfielder 
Thiha Zaw (footballer, born 1994), Burmese football defender 
Win Zaw Oo (born 1977), tallest person in Burma
Win Zaw (born 1982) is a Burmese House of Nationalities MP 
Ye Zaw Htet Aung (born 1991), Burmese football defender 
Zaw Htet Ko Ko (born 1981), Burmese political activist 
Zaw Lin (born 1992), Burmese football midfielder
Zaw Linn Tun (born 1983), Burmese football defender
Zaw Min (minister) (born 1951), Minister for Electric Power of Myanmar 
Zaw Min (politician, born 1949), Burmese House of Nationalities MP
Zaw Min Tun (born 1992), Burmese football defender 
Zaw Moe (born 1967), Burmese golfer 
Zaw Myint Maung (born 1951), Burmese politician 
Zaw One (1945–2009), Burmese actor and singer 
Zaw Win (footballer) (born 1994), Burmese footballer 
Zaw Win Htut (born 1964), Burmese hard rock singer 
Zaw Win Thet (born 1991), Burmese sprint runner 
Zaw Zaw (born 1967), Burmese business tycoon 
Zaw Zaw Aung (born 1971), Burmese artist 
Zaw Zaw Aung (writer) (1937–2016), Burmese author, critic and public intellectual 
Zaw Zaw Oo (born 1989), Burmese football defender

See also
Zaw., taxonomic author abbreviation for Aleksander Zawadzki (naturalist) (1798–1868), Polish naturalist
Zeitschrift für die Alttestamentliche Wissenschaft, a German academic journal
Zambia Alliance of Women, Zambian women's organization

Burmese names